Tulcus obliquefasciatus is a species of beetle in the family Cerambycidae. It was described by Dillon and Dillon in 1952. It is known from Brazil.

References

obliquefasciatus
Beetles described in 1952